is a Japanese Nordic combined skier. He was born in Hachimantai in the Iwate Prefecture. He competed at the FIS Nordic World Ski Championships 2013 in Val di Fiemme, and at the 2014 Winter Olympics in Sochi. He competed at the 2018 Winter Olympics, where he placed 12th in Individual large hill/10 km, 14th in Individual normal hill/10 km, and fourth with the Japanese team in the Team large hill/4 × 5 km.

References

External links

1983 births
Living people
Nordic combined skiers at the 2014 Winter Olympics
Nordic combined skiers at the 2018 Winter Olympics
Nordic combined skiers at the 2022 Winter Olympics
Japanese male Nordic combined skiers
Olympic Nordic combined skiers of Japan
Olympic bronze medalists for Japan
Olympic medalists in Nordic combined
Medalists at the 2022 Winter Olympics